Longford–Roscommon was a parliamentary constituency represented in Dáil Éireann, the lower house of the Irish parliament or Oireachtas from 1992 to 2007. The constituency was served by 4 deputies (Teachtaí Dála, commonly known as TDs). The method of election was proportional representation by means of the single transferable vote (PR-STV).

History and boundaries 
The Longford–Roscommon constituency was created under the Electoral (Amendment) Act 1990 and first used at the 1992 general election. The constituency was previously represented through the constituencies of Roscommon and Longford-Westmeath, both of which were abolished in 1992.

The constituency spanned the entire area of County Longford and County Roscommon, taking in the towns of Longford and Roscommon and many other areas.

It was one of a number of constituencies which were altered by the Electoral (Amendment) Act 2005; with effect from the 2007 general election, the Longford–Roscommon constituency was abolished. Longford joined the recreated constituency of Longford–Westmeath, while Roscommon became part of Roscommon–South Leitrim.

TDs

Elections

2002 general election

1997 general election

1992 general election

See also 
Dáil constituencies
Politics of the Republic of Ireland
Historic Dáil constituencies
Elections in the Republic of Ireland

References

External links 
Oireachtas Members Database

Historic constituencies in County Longford
Historic constituencies in County Roscommon
Dáil constituencies in the Republic of Ireland (historic)
1992 establishments in Ireland
2007 disestablishments in Ireland
Constituencies established in 1992
Constituencies disestablished in 2007